Aaron Michael Shust (born October 31, 1975) is an American contemporary Christian music artist formerly on the Brash Music and Centricity Music labels, and now on his own label. Shust was named the Songwriter of the Year at the GMA Dove Awards of 2007, and his song, "My Savior My God", received the Song of the Year award.

Biography 

Shust was born in Chicago, Illinois and grew up near Pittsburgh, Pennsylvania. He studied music theory at Toccoa Falls College in Georgia. While there, he studied Wolfgang Amadeus Mozart and Johann Sebastian Bach. He also became influenced by U2 and Bob Marley. He began performing at churches and coffeehouses while attending college.

Shust began leading worship at Perimeter Church, Duluth, Georgia in 2000, and recorded his album, Anything Worth Saying, in 2004 with producer, Dan Hannon, who delivered the album along with a stack of others to Brash Music for consideration. Brash Music signed Shust shortly thereafter.

The song "My Savior My God" peaked at No. 1 on six charts simultaneously by April 17: Radio and Records (R&R) Christian adult contemporary (AC) radio chart as played on the Weekend Top 20, R&R Christian AC monitor chart, CRW's AC radio chart, Billboard Hot Christian songs radio chart and Billboard Hot Christian AC chart. The song spent 30 weeks in the Top 5 on the R&R Christian AC chart in 2006. Digital downloads of the song have topped 75,000 copies. The single was the second most played song of 2006 on Christian CHR radio as played on the Weekend 22. It was the No. 1 song of 2006 on 20 The Countdown Magazine. The song was awarded Song of the Year at the 2007 Annual GMA Dove Awards in Nashville.

According to the Nielsen Soundscan report, Anything Worth Saying was the 5th best-selling "Praise and Worship" album of 2006. However, it only sold 300 copies its first week.

At the GMA Dove Awards of 2007 in Nashville, Tennessee, Shust was awarded three Dove Awards: Song of the Year ("My Savior, My God"), Songwriter of the Year, and New Artist of the Year.

Shust's second studio album, Whispered and Shouted, was released on June 5, 2007, and sold 5,000 copies its first week of release.

In 2009, Shust's third album, Take Over, was released, including the Christian radio hit, "To God Alone".
On October 21, he released a Christmas EP.

In August 2011, Shust's fourth album, This Is What We Believe, was released. The album was produced by Ed Cash.

On March 10, 2017, Shust released his first live album, Love Made a Way, which was produced by Nathan Nockels. Four singles released from the album were a studio version of "You Redeem", "Belong", a live version of his 2004 song "My Savior My God", and a radio version of "Resurrecting". The album failed to chart, but "You Redeem" peaked at No. 37 on the Hot Christian Songs chart.

Personal life
When he is not recording or touring, Shust lives outside of Pittsburgh, Pennsylvania with his wife, Sarah and their sons, Daniel, Nicky, and Michael. He also leads worship at his home church in Aliquippa, Pennsylvania.

Discography

Studio albums

Singles

Awards and nominations

GMA Dove Awards

Notes

References

External links
 

 

1975 births
21st-century American singers
American performers of Christian music
Centricity Music artists
Living people
Musicians from Chicago
Musicians from Pittsburgh
People from Toccoa, Georgia
Performers of contemporary Christian music
Performers of contemporary worship music
Toccoa Falls College alumni